Garun Mallam is a Local Government Area in Kano State, Nigeria. Its headquarters are in the town of Garun Mallam on the A2 highway.

It has an area of 214 km and a population of 116,494 at the 2006 census.

The postal code of the area is 711.

References

Local Government Areas in Kano State